Fear and Trembling (original title: Stupeur et Tremblements) is a 2003 French film based on the novel of the same name by Amélie Nothomb. The film was written and directed by Alain Corneau and stars Sylvie Testud.

Plot 
Amélie, a young Belgian woman (Sylvie Testud), having spent her childhood in Japan, decides to return to live there and try to integrate into Japanese society.  She is determined to be a "real Japanese" before her one year contract runs out, though it is precisely this determination that is incompatible with Japanese humility.  Though she is hired for a choice position as a translator at an import/export firm, her inability to understand Japanese cultural and business norms and allocation to work for which she is not suited result in increasingly humiliating demotions.

Though Amelie secretly adores her immediate supervisor, Ms Mori (Kaori Tsuji), the latter takes sadistic pleasure in belittling Amelie.  Mori finally manages to break Amelie's will by making her the bathroom attendant, and is delighted when Amelie tells her that she will not renew her contract.  Amelie realizes that she is finally a real Japanese when she enters the company president's office "with fear and trembling," which was possible only because her determination had been broken by Mori's systematic humiliation.

The title, "Fear and Trembling", is said in the film to be the way Japanese must behave when addressing the Emperor. For Westerners, it calls to mind a line from Philippians 2:12, "continue to work out your salvation with fear and trembling", which could also describe Amélie's attitude during her year at Yumimoto.

Cast 
 Sylvie Testud as Amélie
 Kaori Tsuji as Fubuki
 Taro Suwa as Mr. Saito
 Bison Katayama as Mr. Omochi
 Yasunari Kondo as Mr. Tenshi
 Sokyu Fujita as Mr. Haneda
 Gen Shimaoka as Mr. Unaji
 Heileigh Gomes as young Amélie 
 Eri Sakai as young Fubuki

Critical response
On Rotten Tomatoes, the film holds an approval rating of 91%, based on 35 reviews, with an average rating of 7.3/10. The site's critical consensus reads, "This tale of culture clash is by turns downbeat and hilarious." On Metacritic the film has a score of 75 out of 100, based on 17 critics, indicating "generally favorable reviews".

A. O. Scott of The New York Times wrote that though there are moments in the film which seem well observed, there are also times when the film slips toward stereotyping.

Accolades

References

External links

2003 films
French comedy-drama films
Films based on Belgian novels
Films directed by Alain Corneau
Films featuring a Best Actress César Award-winning performance
Films featuring a Best Actress Lumières Award-winning performance
Films set in Japan
Office work in popular culture
Japan in non-Japanese culture